Streptomyces regensis is a bacterium species from the genus of Streptomyces. Streptomyces regensis produces actinomycin and cyanohydrin phosphonate.

See also 
 List of Streptomyces species

References

Further reading

External links
Type strain of Streptomyces regensis at BacDive -  the Bacterial Diversity Metadatabase

regensis
Bacteria described in 1963